Through the Forests and Through the Trees is a 1956 West German historical comedy film directed by G. W. Pabst and starring Eva Bartok, Peter Arens, and Joe Stöckel. It was Pabst's final film. The film's sets were designed by the art director Ludwig Reiber. It was shot at the Bavaria Studios in Munich and on location in Venice and Zwiesel. It was made in Eastmancolor.

Cast

References

Bibliography

External links
 

1956 films
1956 comedy films
1950s historical comedy films
1950s German-language films
German historical comedy films
West German films
Films directed by G. W. Pabst
Films about classical music and musicians
Films about composers
Films set in the 1810s
Films shot at Bavaria Studios
1950s German films